Mar Thoma College of Science & Technology is owned and managed by a Registered Society namely The Mar Thoma Educational, Technical, Training and Research Centre (Mar Thoma ETTARC), under the Trivandrum-Quilon Diocese of the Mar Thoma Church. This college is affiliated to the University of Kerala and has 7 undergraduate and 5 post graduate courses.

References

Christian universities and colleges in India
Colleges affiliated to the University of Kerala
Universities and colleges in Kollam district
Educational institutions established in 1995
1995 establishments in Kerala